Tepuianthus is a genus of flowering plants belonging to the family Thymelaeaceae.

Its native range is Venezuela, Northern Brazil and Colombia.

Species:

Tepuianthus aracensis 
Tepuianthus auyantepuiensis 
Tepuianthus colombianus 
Tepuianthus sarisarinamensis 
Tepuianthus savannensis 
Tepuianthus yapacanensis

References

Thymelaeaceae
Malvales genera